The County of Hampden is one of the 37 counties of Victoria which are part of the cadastral divisions of Australia, used for land titles. The county is in the Western District of Victoria bounded by Lake Corangamite in the east and the Hopkins River in the west. In the north and south the county was bounded approximately by the existing roads, now the Glenelg Highway and the Princes Highway. Larger towns include Terang and Skipton . The county was proclaimed in 1849.

Parishes 
Parishes within the county:
Borriyalloak
Caramballuc South
Chatsworth (part in the County of Villiers)
Cobra Killuc
Colongulac
Connewarren
Corangamite
Darlington 
Darlington West 
Dunnawalla
Eilyar
Ellerslie
Ettrick
Framlingham East
Galla   
Garvoc 
Geelengla 
Glenormiston
Gnarkeet
Hexham East
Jellalabad
Kariah
Keilambete
Kilnoorat
Kolara
Koort-koort-nong  
Kornong   
Ligar
Lismore
Marida Yallock
Mortlake
Nerrin Nerrin
Panmure
Pircarra
Purrumbete North 
Skipton
Struan
Taaraak
Terang 
Terrinallum  
Tooliorook
Toorak
Towanway
Vite Vite
Wooriwyrite  
Woorndoo

References

Research aids, Victoria 1910
Map of the counties of Follett, Dundas, Ripon, Normanby, Villiers, Hampden, Heytesbury / John Sands

Counties of Victoria (Australia)
Barwon South West (region)